The Iranian ambassador in Dushanbe is the official representative of the Government in Tehran to the Government of Tajikistan.

List of representatives

See also
Tajikistan–Iran relations

References 

 
Tajikistan
Iran